Richard Disney may refer to:

 Richard Disney (politician) (by 1505–1578), English member of parliament
 Richard Disney (economist) (born 1950), British economist
 Richard L. Disney (1887–1976), American judge on the United States Tax Court